Antonella Salvucci  (born 18 December 1981, in Civitavecchia) is an Italian model, journalist, TV personality, and actress.

Biography 

Her artistic career began as a model and was enriched with various roles in successful television dramas such as  Carabinieri ,  Il maresciallo Rocca, Distretto di Polizia ,  Un medico in famiglia 3, Rex , Era mio fratello, Il bello delle donne 2 ,  La stagione dei delitti ,   Moana .

In the cinematographic field she has played various leading roles such as in the film  Eugénie's Sentimental Education  directed by Aurelio Grimaldi and in others in minor roles such as  The Torturer  by Lamberto Bava,  The Family Friend by Paolo Sorrentino,  Night of the Sinner  by Alessandro Perrella,  The Red Dot  by Marco Carlucci,   The Anger  by Louis Nero and  Red Riding Hood  by Giacomo Cimini.

In the field of television she leads the cinema column  Ciak si gira  on the internet channel  Primo Italia Tv , all editions of Fantafestival with prestigious names such as Murray Abraham, Roger Corman, Dario Argento and all editions of  Roma Film Festival  with Giancarlo Giannini, Lina Wertmüller, Abel Ferrara, Willem Dafoe, on Rai 2 the TV Format dedicated to New Talents "New Stars Notte" and hosts other prestigious cinema awards in Italy and abroad.

In 2000 she recorded the musical piece Fever, while in the theatrical field she made her debut in 2004 in the musical comedy Vampiri directed by Bruno Maccallini and in 2008 she played the heroine Lara Croft in the musical Pulcinella directed by Lino Moretti.

In December 2020 she was awarded the Vincenzo Crocitti International Award.

Filmography

Fiction TV 
 2000 – Assassins accidentally directed by Vittorio De Sisti
 2001 – Marshal Rocca 3 directed by Josè Maria Sanchez
 2002 – The beauty of women 2  directed by Maurizio Ponzi
 2003 – A doctor in the family directed by Claudio Norza
 2003 – The season of crimes directed by Claudio Bonivento
 2005 – Carabinieri 5 directed by Sergio Martino
 2005 – Police District 5  directed by Lucio Gaudino
 2007 – He was my brother  directed by Claudio Bonivento
 2008 – Damn director miserydirected by Lina Wertmüller
 2009 – Moana directed by Alfredo Peyretti
 2011 – Night before the exams'82 directed by Elisabetta Marchetti
 2013 – The two laws directed by Luciano Manuzzi
 2014 – The Restorer directed by Enrico Oldoini

Cinema 
 2002 – Open your eyes and dreams directed by Rosario Errico
 2003 – The playground of the senses directed by Enrico Bernard
 2003 – Crazy Blood directed by Gaetano Russo
 2003 – The Red Dot directed by Giacomo Cimini
 2005 – The Sentimental Education of Eugenie directed by Aurelio Grimaldi
 2005 – The Torturer  directed by Lamberto Bava
 2006 – The Family Friend directed by Paolo Sorrentino
 2006 – The red spot  directed by Marco Carlucci
 2008 – The anger directed by Louis Nero
 2009 – Night of the Sinner directed by Alessandro Perrella
 2011 – 5  directed by Francesco Dominedò
 2011 – Bloody Sin directed by Domiziano Cristopharo
 2011 – Young Europe directed by Matteo Vicino
 2011 – Bellerofonte directed by Domiziano Cristopharo
 2012 – Tulpa - Perdizioni mortali directed by Federico Zampaglione
 2013 – Midway - Between life and death directed by John Real
 2014 – The Second Chance directed by D. Gulli
 2015 – Milano in the Cage directed by Fabio Bastianello
 2015 – The Voice and the Diva  directed by Michael Oblowitz
 2016 – The American connection directed by J. Espanol
 2016 – The Carillon directed by John Real
 2017 – Feel the dead- the Rising directed by John Real
 2017 – Odio la Juventus directed by L. Minoli
 2018 – The Music Box directed by John Real
 2018 – The Poison Rose directed by Francesco Cinquemani
 2019 – Shelter directed by C.Bido

Conduzioni TV 
 2000 Gran Gala Academy of the Sanremo Song with Giancarlo Magalli
 Dal 2002 -Ciak turns (journal as video dedicated to deepening and film promotion)
 2003 – Fantafestival (fino al 2011)
 2004 – Roma Film Festival – Gala di cinema dedicated to Marcello Mastroianni su RaiSat Cinema World
 2004 – Premio internazionale della Fotografia Cinematografica Gianni Di Venanzo (fino al 2010)
 2006 – Trailers FilmFest (fino al 2013)
 2006 – Format TV Numeri 1 su Rai 2
 2006 – Premio Fregene per Fellini
 2006 – Premio 80 anni Radiocorriere TV
 2007 – XII Prize Sorrento Peninsula Arturo Esposito
 2007 – 15 edition of Cinema Award Mirto D'Oro
 2007 – Writing and Image Award Film Festival (fino al 2010)
 2008 – Premio Flaiano 35^ edizione with Andrea Vianello su Rai 3
 2008 –  International Short Film Festival (fino al 2009)
 2009 – New Stars Night format TV dedicato a Nuovi Talenti (fino al 2010) su Rai 2
 2010 –  2nd Prize A literary fiction book in the drawer
 2010 – Prize A life in film
 2010 – Premio Flaiano 37^ edizione su Rai 3
 2010 – Final Reate Festival su Rai 1
 2011 – XI Edition of the Carthage International Award
 2011 – International Award on Road Safety BLUE PLATE
 2011 – 3rd Prize A literary fiction book in the drawer 3º Premio letterario di narrativa Un libro nel cassetto
 2011 – Miss Summer Artwork Fashion
 2011 – Premio Flaiano 38^ edizione with Dario Vergassola su Rai 3
 2011 – 3^ 3 edition Maratea Film Festival
 2011 – 3rd International Film Festival Award Valsele
 2011 – 68 ^ Show On Film Festival of the Venice Biennale 68^
 2011 – Italian Art and Fashion World
 2012 – Premio Flaiano 39^ edizione with Dario Vergassola su Rai 3
 2012 – 4th of fiction Literary Prize A book in the drawer
 2012 – International Road Safety Award BLUE PLATE
 2013 – XII Edition of The International Prize Carthage
 2013 – National Final Competition High School Game with Alessandro Greco
 2013 – A Dream For The Cinema Edition national competition
 2013 – Fashion Award for A face model
 2013 – 11°Angel Film Awards Monaco Internacional Film Festival
 2014 – Gran Gala 64º Festival di Sanremo
 2014 – National Final Competition High School Game with Alessandro Greco
 2014 – XIII Edition of the International Prize Carthage
 2014 – XII edition of War and Peace 
 2014 – XII Edition of TrailersFilmFest
 2015 – Gran Gala 65th Sanremo Festival 
 2015 – 10th Festival of Cortinametraggio [
 2015 – 15th Edition Grand Prix Corallo
 2015 – Premio Flaiano 42^ edizione with Lucio Valentini
 2015 – XIII Edizione di TrailersFilmFest
 2016 – VI Gran Gala of Liguria Edition Numbers One city of Sanremo 
 2016 – Live From Cannes on Iris
 2016 – National Final Competition High School Game with Alessandro Greco
 2016 – Live From Ischia on Iris
 2017 – VII Grand Gala of Liguria Edition Numbers One city of Sanremo

Advertising 
 2001 – Spot Televisivo Permaflex directed by Leone Pompucci
 2004 – Testimonial Cerbiatto e Festival Crociere
 2004 – Magazine Fotografare cover July
 2009 – Magazine Elaborare Cover December 
 2010 – Magazine Cover Ruoteclassiche September
 2010 – 2011 Televendita Ricapil Rapido, foam for hair loss, with Marco Di Buono
 2011 – Testimonial book series tells Rome 
 2014 – Testimonial Postepay Fias Card
 2014 – No Violence

Teatro 
 2004 – Musical Vampiri  directed by Bruno Maccallini al Teatro De' Servi
 2008 – Musical  Pulcinella  directed by Lino Moretti nel ruolo di Lara Croft al Teatro Sistina

Altre attività

Videoclip 
 2005 –  Panico  del gruppo musicale B-Nice directed by Luigi Cozzi
 2013 –  Trasparente  del cantautore Marco Rò directed by Angelo Puzzutiello
 2014 –  Come fossi un burattino  of the band Falsidei
 2015 – Polvere e cenere of the band Rione Roots

Discografia 
 2000 – Fever text di Antonella Salvucci, music by Roberto Russo

References

External links

Italian female models
Italian actresses
Living people
1981 births
Models from Rome